Leonid Arkayev (born 3 June 1940) is a Russian gymnast. He was inducted into the International Gymnastics Hall of Fame in 2011.

References 

1940 births
Living people
Gymnasts from Moscow
Russian male artistic gymnasts